Rotterdam Ska-Jazz Foundation is a band from the Netherlands playing a mix of ska, jazz, rocksteady, reggae and soul, with a strong 1960s influence.

Discography
 2015: Knock-Turn-All (WTF Records)
 2007: Motiv Loco (Megalith Records)
 2005: Sunwalk U.S. (Megalith Records)
 2005: Sunwalk (Grover Records)
 2004: Black Night - Bright Morning (Grover Records)
 2003: Shake Your Foundation! (Grover Records)

Current members (as of 2011)
Arjen Bijleveld - Trombone
Zoot - Sax
Joep van Rhijn - Trumpet
Jeroen van Tongeren - Guitar
Merijn van de Wijdeven - Bass
Hidde Wijga - Keys
Dimitri Jeltsema - Drums

External links
 Official website

Musical groups from Rotterdam